The Persian embassy to Europe (1609–1615) was dispatched by the Persian Shah Abbas I in 1609 to obtain an alliance with Europe against the Ottoman Empire. The embassy was led by the Englishman Robert Shirley.

Background
The Safavid Persians had then been at war with their archrivals, the neighbouring Ottoman Empire, for more than a century, and so decided to try to obtain European help against the Ottomans. Besides the territorial antagonism of the Ottoman and Persian realms, there was also strong religious antagonism, as the Persians proclaimed Shiism against the Ottoman Empire's Sunnism. These Persian efforts at rapprochement with Catholic Europe (Spain, the Habsburg Empire, and Italy), attempted to counterbalance the Franco-Ottoman alliance (between France and the Ottoman Empire), and came at a time when Persia was in direct conflict against the Ottoman Empire in the Ottoman–Safavid War (1603–1618). This embassy followed the 1599–1602 Persian embassy to Europe.

Embassy

The embassy went to Cracow, Prague, Florence, Rome, Madrid, London, and returned to Persia through the Great Mogul's India. Shirley was extremely well received in these countries, which were in regular conflict with the Ottoman Empire. The reception in Cracow was excellent and in Prague, where Shirley was knighted. He was also made a Count Palatine of the Holy Roman Empire by Rudolf II in 1609. He then continued to Florence, Milan and Rome, where he was received by Pope Paul V. He then continued to Spain.

In 1611, Shirley reached England, but he was opposed by the Levant Company, which had strong interests with Ottomans.

Shirley then returned to Persia by sea, through the Cape of Good Hope to land in India, at the mouth of the Indus, escaping from an attempt on his life by the Portuguese. He finally returned to Ispahan with his wife in 1615. All his traveling companions however had died on the way in a poisoning conspiracy.

Aftermath

In 1616, a trade agreement was reached between Shah Abbas and the East India Company and in 1622 "a joint Anglo-Persian force expelled the Portuguese and Spanish traders from the Persian Gulf" in the Capture of Ormuz.

In 1624, Robert Shirley led another embassy to England in order to obtain trade agreements.

See also
Habsburg-Persian alliance
Persian embassy to Louis XIV

Notes

References
 Guy Le Strange, Juan de Persia Don Juan of Persia: A Shi'ah Catholic 1560–1604 Routledge, 2004 
 Tabish Khair, Martin Leer, Justin D. Edwards, Hanna Ziadeh, Amitav Ghosh Other routes: 1500 years of African and Asian travel writing Indiana University Press, 2005 
 Jean-Pierre Maquerlot, Michèle Willems Travel and drama in Shakespeare's time Cambridge University Press, 1996 
 Badi Badiozamani, Ghazal Badiozamani Iran and America: Re-Kindling a Love Lost East West Understanding Pr., 2005 
 James Stuart Olson, Robert Shadle Historical dictionary of the British empire Greenwood Publishing Group, 1996 

Political history of Iran
17th century in Europe
17th century in Asia
History of the foreign relations of Iran
17th century in Iran
Iran–United Kingdom relations
Diplomatic missions of Safavid Iran